Albert Edward McKenzie VC (23 October 1898 – 3 November 1918) was an English recipient of the Victoria Cross, the highest and most prestigious award for gallantry in the face of the enemy that can be awarded to British and Commonwealth forces.

Details
McKenzie was a 19-year-old able seaman in the Royal Navy during the First World War who was taking part in the Zeebrugge Raid when he performed the deed for which he was awarded the VC.

On 22/23 April 1918 at Zeebrugge, Belgium, Able Seaman McKenzie was a member of a storming party on the night of the operation. He landed with his machine-gun in the face of great difficulties, advancing down the Mole with his commanding officer (Arthur Leyland Harrison) who with most of his party was killed. The seaman accounted for several of the enemy running for shelter to a destroyer alongside the Mole, and was severely wounded whilst working his gun in an exposed position.

He was presented with his VC by King George V at Buckingham Palace. However, having almost recovered from his wounds, he died of influenza during the world flu pandemic at the beginning of November 1918. He is buried in Camberwell Old Cemetery, South London.

The medal
Mckenzie's Victoria Cross is still owned by the McKenzie family and is on loan to the Imperial War Museum in London.

Commemoration

A memorial in honour of Albert McKenzie VC was unveiled on 23 October 2015 (the 117th anniversary of his birth) at the junction of Tower Bridge Road, Decima Street and Bermondsey Street, Bermondsey, in the London Borough of Southwark.

References

Further reading
 David Harvey, Monuments to Courage (1999)
 The Register of the Victoria Cross (This England, 1997)
 Stephen Snelling, VCs of the First World War: The Naval VCs (2002)
 Deborah Lake, The Zeebrugge and Ostend Raids 1918 (Barnsley, 2002)

External links
Location of grave and VC medal (S.E. London)
 Albert McKenzie VC memorial unveiled in Tower Bridge Road

1898 births
1918 deaths
People from Bermondsey
Royal Navy personnel of World War I
Military personnel from London
Royal Navy sailors
British World War I recipients of the Victoria Cross
Deaths from the Spanish flu pandemic in England
Royal Navy recipients of the Victoria Cross